Albert Ivan Payton (20 January 1898 – 27 September 1967) was an English cricketer. Payton was a right-handed batsman who bowled right-arm medium pace. He was born in Stapleford, Nottinghamshire.

Payton made a single first-class appearance for Nottinghamshire against Lancashire at Lod Trafford in the 1922 County Championship. He scored 15 runs in Nottinghamshire's first-innings of 226 all out, before being dismissed by Dick Tyldesley, while in their second-innings of 62 all out, he was dismissed for a single run by Lawrence Cook. Lancashire won Payton's only first-class appearance by an innings and 108 runs.

He died at Sandiacre, Derbyshire on 27 September 1967. His brother Wilfred Payton, Sr. and nephew Wilfred Payton, Jr. both played first-class cricket.

References

External links
Albert Payton at ESPNcricinfo
Albert Payton at CricketArchive

1898 births
1967 deaths
People from Stapleford, Nottinghamshire
Cricketers from Nottinghamshire
English cricketers
Nottinghamshire cricketers